Monsal Dale is a valley in Derbyshire, England, in the White Peak limestone area of the Peak District National Park. It is a Site of Special Scientific Interest (SSSI), a Special Area of Conservation (SAC) (1) and part of a Europe-wide network called Natura 2000.

Headstone viaduct

The Headstone Viaduct was built by the Midland Railway over the River Wye. Initially, some slippage occurred, and remedial work was carried out in 1907–08.

Whilst considered elegant today, with Grade II listed status being assigned to it in 1970, when it was built in 1863 it was seen as destroying the beauty of the dale. John Ruskin, considered to be Britain's leading cultural critic, harshly criticised the building of the railway:

A proposal that never came to fruition was for another viaduct for the Lancashire, Derbyshire and East Coast Railway to cross both the valley and the Midland Line, some three hundred feet high.

Monsal Trail
The viaduct is now part of the Monsal Trail. Headstone Tunnel, at the southern end of the viaduct, was re-opened to the public in May 2011, along with nearby Cressbrook and Litton Tunnels.

Monsal Dale railway station
Monsal Dale railway station opened in 1866 to serve the villages of Upperdale and Cressbrook, with the latter's cotton mills. The down line and platform was built on a shelf carved in the rock face, while the up was built on wooden trestles over the hillside. It closed in 1959 and nothing remains of the timber buildings.

From Monsal Dale, the line proceeded through Cressbrook (471 yards) and Litton (515 yards) tunnels to Millers Dale on its way north. Cut through solid limestone, they were both complex tunnels, on a gradient of 1 in 100, and curved to allow the line to conform to the terrain.

See also

List of bridges in the United Kingdom
Manchester, Buxton, Matlock and Midlands Junction Railway
Monsal Trail
Listed buildings in Little Longstone

References

External links

 Ingenious.org Headstone Viaduct 1893
 "Geograph "Monsal Head overlooking the viaduct
 Monsal Head
 "Picture the Past" Monsal Dale viaduct and the River Wye
 Weir at Monsal Dale photograph

Valleys of Derbyshire
Valleys of the Peak District